Milecastle 68 (Boomby Gill) is a conjectured milecastle of the Roman Hadrian's Wall.  The site of the milecastle (adjacent to Boomby Gill) has been calculated from measurement to known milecastle sites, but no remains providing proof of its existence have been identified.

Excavations and investigations
1969 –  English Heritage Field Investigation.  It was noted that no visible remains existed.
1972 –  English Heritage Field Investigation. The Field Investigator speculated that it could have been opened in an attempt to find the north-west angle of the milecastle, but without apparent success. The trench had, however revealed many undressed stones, some large.
1990 –  Hadrian's Wall Project Field Investigation.  It was noted that no visible remains existed, and no trace of the trench noted by the previous Field Investigator could be identified.

Associated turrets 
Each milecastle on Hadrian's Wall had two associated turret structures.  These turrets were positioned approximately one-third and two-thirds of a Roman mile to the west of the Milecastle, and would probably have been manned by part of the milecastle's garrison.  The turrets associated with Milecastle 68 are known as Turret 68A and Turret 68B, though no evidence of either has been identified.

Monument records

References

Bibliography

68